The following is a list of the most extreme temperatures ever recorded in Canada.

Highest temperature readings (selected locations)

Highest temperatures ever recorded in Canada

Lowest temperature readings

Yearly Canadian temperature extremes
 Note that minimum extremes are for the entire winter season ending in the year listed.

Occurrences by province

Extreme maximum occurrences by community

Extreme minimum occurrences by town

Yearly Canadian average mean temperatures

Occurrences by province

Extreme warmest year occurrences by location

Extreme coldest year occurrences by location

See also
 Weather extremes in Canada
 Temperature in Canada

References

3. Book of Lists, Scholastic Canada, 2005, Pages 80 and 81 and 69

External links

Weather events in Canada
Weather extremes of Earth
Canada